Mallur may refer to:
Mallur, Ariyalur, a village in Ariyalur district, Tamil Nadu, India
Mallur, Karnataka, a village in Bangalore district, Karnataka, India
Mallur, Salem, a village in Salem district, Tamil Nadu, India
Malluru, a village in Chikkaballapur district, Karnataka, India